Munkedal Municipality (Munkedals kommun) is a municipality in Västra Götaland County in western Sweden. Its seat is located in the town of Munkedal.

The nationwide municipal reform of 1952 saw the creation of Munkedal, Svarteborg, Sörbygden and Ödeborg as larger rural municipalities. As early as 1967 Ödeborg was dissolved and parts of it added to Munkedal. Finally, in 1974 Svarteborg and Sörbygden were merged into Munkedal forming the present unit.

Etymology
The municipality is named after the old farm Munkedal. This farm was owned by the monks at Dragsmark Abbey. The last element is dal 'dale, valley'.

Geography
Munkedal is located 110 km north of Gothenburg. The geography is a varied terrain, covered with part forests, part mountains, part plains and part lakes and streams.

Localities
Inhabitants 2005:
Munkedal  	3,838 (seat)
Dingle 	889
Hällevadsholm 	723
Hedekas 	358

Subdivisions
Munkedal has 8 parishes, within the Diocese of Gothenburg, the sub divisioning used by the Church of Sweden. Their inhabitants 1 January 2005 and changes since 1 January 2004 are:

Foss  	5,020  	-52
Svarteborg 	2,683 	+12
Krokstad 	1,043 	+-0
Håby 	468 	+12
Hede 	495 	+10
Bärfendal 	248 	+8
Valbo Ryr 	262 	-9
Sanne 	186 	-10

Source:

History
This area in western Sweden, by the Norwegian border, has been inhabited perhaps longer than any other in Sweden. Distinctives for Munkedal are some tools that have been dated to 8000 BC, found around 1900 at a farm named Herregårda. There is also a petroglyph area called Lökeberg på Tungenäset, dated to the Nordic Bronze Age.

In the medieval age, a monastery of Dragsmark was located within the current municipal borders. It subsequently led to the name Munkedal, and the names chosen for the municipality when it was established in 1974 with the reform. The coat of arms also portrait a medieval scroll and writing pen, characteristics for monks.

Notability
The Munkedal Railroad, a narrow gauge museum railroad, inaugurated in 1896. A railroad museum is also situated by it.

The area, troubled by battles between Norwegian and Swedish armies, has several defence structures that can be visited. In addition, there are many old churches from the medieval age of interest.

References

External links

Munkedal Municipality - Official site
 Article Munkedal from Nordisk Familjebok

Municipalities of Västra Götaland County
Gothenburg and Bohus